Mermer may refer to:

Persons
Mermer Blakeslee, American novelist
Etienne Mermer (born 1977), Vanuatu footballer
Sami Mermer, Turkish-Kurdish-Canadian film director

Places
 Mermer, Sur